Lens is a municipality of Wallonia located in the province of Hainaut, Belgium. 

In 2007 its population was 4042. The total area is 49.42 km² which gives a population density of 80 inhabitants per km².

The municipality consists of the following districts: Bauffe, Cambron-Saint-Vincent, Lens, Lombise, and Montignies-lez-Lens.

It is located along the N56 road.

References

External links
 

Municipalities of Hainaut (province)